Air Dolomiti S.p.A. is an Italian regional airline with its head office in Dossobuono, Villafranca di Verona, Italy, operating base at Verona Villafranca Airport and focus cities at Munich Airport and Frankfurt Airport in Germany. It is a wholly owned subsidiary of Lufthansa. Air Dolomiti operates a network of routes from several Italian destinations to and from Munich and Frankfurt. Most of these services are sold under the Air Dolomiti brand and codeshared with Lufthansa, while a few remain under the Lufthansa brand.

History
Air Dolomiti was established on 30 December 1989 by the Linee Aeree Europee (L.A.E). The airline's name derives from the section of the Alps known as The Dolomites. It started airline operations in January 1991 with a Trieste-Genoa route and in 1992 started international services with flights from Verona to Munich.

After several years of co-operation, Lufthansa acquired a 26% stake in January 1999 and increased it to 52% in April 2003 and 100% in July 2003.

The airline employed some 748 people at June 2020 and although most Lufthansa Regional subsidiaries operate under their parent's name and colours, Air Dolomiti retains its own identity. At one time the airline's registered office was in Dossobuono, Villafranca di Verona, while the airline's executive headquarters were in Ronchi dei Legionari.

In September 2018, Lufthansa announced it would expand Air Dolomiti's fleet significantly by 12 pre-owned Embraer 190 and 195 aircraft to be transferred from sister company Lufthansa CityLine. However in late 2021, Lufthansa stated that the relocation was no longer confirmed and maybe continued later or on a smaller scale if at all. Later on, two Embraer 195 were relocated from Lufthansa CityLine by spring 2022. In late 2022, Lufthansa confirmed it would transfer further aircraft from Lufthansa CityLine to Air Dolomiti to strengthen the group's presence in Italy after its bid to take over ITA Airways fell apart.

Destinations 

As of February 2021, Air Dolomiti operates routes from Frankfurt Airport and Munich Airport to 14 destinations in Italy and Europe in cooperation with parent Lufthansa in addition to a domestic Italian network.

Codeshare agreements
Air Dolomiti has codeshare agreements with the following airlines:

 Air Canada
 Air China
 All Nippon Airways
 Lufthansa
 United Airlines

Fleet

Current fleet
, Air Dolomiti operates the following aircraft:

Several of Air Dolomiti's aircraft are named after famous Italian operas, as a tribute to the city of Verona and its famous ancient theatre, the Arena di Verona.

Historic fleet
Air Dolomiti previously also operated the following types of aircraft:

Accidents and incidents
 On 7 November 1999 Air Dolomiti Flight 2708, a Fokker 100, wet-leased from Alpi Eagles (registration I-ALPL, c/n 11250), flying from Venice, Italy, with 44 on board suffered landing gear failure while on the runway at Barcelona, Spain. It came to rest safely on a grassy area near the runway.
 On 24 August 2008 an Air Dolomiti ATR 72 (registration I-ADLM, c/n 543), operating flight LH3990 from Munich, Germany, to Bologna, Italy, abandoned take off due to smoke alarm. The airline treated the evacuation of the as a minor incident, but on August 26 an amateur video, filmed by a bystander, circulated on television and the Internet. The footage shows tense moments of some 60 passengers jumping from and fleeing the burning plane before the fire department extinguish the flames.
On 17 May 2012 an Air Dolomiti ATR 72-500 operating on flight EN-1912/LH-1912 from Munich to Venice returned to Munich after the right engine shut down and smoke was discovered in both cockpit and cabin. Shortly after touchdown the plane deviated from the southern runway and came to a standstill about 80 metres (262 feet) into the grass covered side strip. The nose gear is reported to have collapsed in the process. Of the 58 passengers and four crew members aboard, five passengers are reported to have received minor injuries.

References

External links

 

Airlines established in 1991
Airlines of Italy
Companies based in Veneto
Italian companies established in 1991
Lufthansa